Yasmah-Adad (Yasmah-Addu, Yasmakh-Adad, Ismah-Adad, Iasmakh-Adad) was the younger son of the Amorite king of Upper Mesopotamia, Shamshi-Adad I. He was put on throne of Mari by his father after a successful military attack following the assassination of Yahdun-Lim of Mari in 1796 B.C.E. He was responsible for the southwestern section of his father's kingdom (of which Mari was the capital) including the Balikh River, Habur River, and Euphrates River. Yasmah-Adad's administrative district bordered the state of Yamkhad and the Syrian steppe (inhabited by semi-nomadic peoples). His father controlled the northern part of the kingdom from Shubat-Enlil, and his older brother, Ishme-Dagan, ruled over the southeast area from Ekallatum.  Yasmah-Adad's leadership of Mari and the surrounding districts around the Euphrates ended when his father died, and the Amorite Zimri-Lim and his army chased him out of Mari and took his throne in 1775 B.C. The sources do not fully agree, but state that he was either chased out of his borders or killed before being allowed to flee.

Political marriage 
Shamshi-Adad I played a major role in his son's life and frequently micro-managed his son's affairs. In one instance, in order to facilitate a military alliance with the western Syrian city-state of Qatna, an ally in the fight against the enemy state of Yamkhad, Shamshi-Adad I arranged for the marriage of his son to princess Beltum, the daughter of the king of Qatna, Ishi-Adad. Shamshi-Adad I and Beltum's father both wished her to have a leading role in the palace; however, Yasmah-Adad was already married to the daughter of Yahdun-Lim, who was Yasmah-Adad's leading wife at Mari. As a result, he relegated Beltum, his second wife, to a secondary position in the palace. Shamshi-Adad I was angry with Yasmah-Adad at his refusal to follow orders, and forced him to keep Beltum by his side in the palace.

Some may argue that this instance of control demonstrated the extent of power Shamshi-Adad I had over his sons and over his kingdom in general. While Yasmah-Adad and Ishme-Dagan held esteemed titles and ruled in their corresponding capitals, their power seems to have been conceptual and they may have been political puppets established in power to do their father's bidding.

Criticism from his family
Yasmah-Adad is most well known for the criticism he received from his father. Yasmah-Adad was accused of being lazy, self indulgent and not applying himself to his kingly duties. He was once chided for dallying with women and abandoning his duties for his sexual pleasures. The correspondence between the father and sons was found in the archives of the city of Mari and provides an interesting and at times humorous look into the dynamics of this family.   He was ridiculed frequently by both his brother Ishme-Dagan and his father and was accused of inactive leadership over his district.  Yasmah-Adad's character was attacked within a letter from his father Shamshi-Adad I, which states, "How long do we have to guide you in every matter? Are you a child, and not an adult? Don't you have a beard on your chin? When are you going to take charge of your house? Don't you see that your brother is leading vast armies? So, you too, take charge of your palace, your house!" Another letter from his father indicates Shamshi-Adad I's irritation with his youngest son's behavior, comparing Yasmah-Adad to his older brother, a successful warrior: "While here your brother is victorious, down there you lie about among the women." Many of these critiques arose from Yasmah-Adad's failure to perform the political duties that were his to deal with, regardless of what his father was doing. It was Yasmah-Adad's responsibility to fill certain positions within his district, such as appointing a governor of Terqa, or delegating the position of mayor for the Mari palace, and his failure to fulfill these duties was the basis of many of his father's terse letters.

Yasmah-Adad's critiques did not come solely from his father; however, as is demonstrated in several correspondences between him and his older brother. Ishme-Dagan scolds his brother, "Why are you setting up a wail about this thing? That is not great conduct," and eventually advises him to communicate with their father through him as intermediary. This might have been out of a desire to help his younger brother, but it could also have been a maneuver to gain Ishme-Dagan more political standing. He indicates his desire to be the intermediary between his brother and father in letters with such phrases as, "Write me what you are intending to write to the king, so that, where possible, I can advise you myself."
Another example of the complicated, strained relationship between the brothers is found in a letter written by Yasmah-Adad to his brother Ishme-Dagan:
"Thus (speaks) Yasmah-Addu, Your son. I listened to the Tablet which Daddy sent me, which ran as follow: 'How much longer do we have to keep you on a leading rein? You are a child, you are not a man, you have no beard on your chin! How much longer are you going to fail running your household properly? Don't you realize that your brother is commanding enormous armies? so you (jolly well) command your palace and household properly!' That is what Daddy wrote to me. Now, how can I be a child and incapable of directing affairs when daddy promoted me? How is it that, although I grew up with Daddy from when I was tiny, now some servant or other has succeeded in ousting me from Daddy's affections? So I am coming to Daddy right now, to have it out with daddy about my unhappiness!" (ARM 1.108: Dalley 1984;34)
Historical opinion of Yasmah-Adad revolves mainly around these letters, because they are the most abundant primary sources written about Yasmah-Adad. This criticism possibly reflects the stress that Shamshi-Adad I felt as his newly formed empire already began to crumble; considering, as pointed out by Yasmah-Adad in this letter, his father did appoint Yasmah-Adad as a chief ruler of Mari, one of the largest urban centers, as well as being one of the most disputed in his kingdom, when one of his generals could have also filled the position. Yasmah-Adad managed the region well considering the Ashur kingdom was under attack from outside and inside its borders. However, other sources may support his father's belief. Most primary sources from the era do not mention any military action on his part. When his father died, Zimri-Lim was able to chase Yasmah-Adad out of the throne in Mari seemingly without much of a fight, while his brother Ishme-Dagan lost control of all of his portion of his father's kingdom save for Ekallatum and Assur.

Military brutality 
Letters between Yasmah-Adad and Shamshi-Adad I show the role he played in his father’s brutal expansionist military campaign of 1781 B.C.E., particularly in regards with the Ya’ilanum tribe. Whereas letters and inscriptions describing other battles reveal a non-violent treatment of captured enemies, letters to Yasmah-Adad contained instructions to kill all the members of this tribe. "Give an order that the sons (of the tribe) of Ya'ilanum, all those who are with you, must die tonight ... They must die and be buried in the graves!" Later, in a letter to Yasmah-Adad, Ishme-Dagan described the execution of the Yai’ilanum. "Mar-Addu and all the sons (of the tribe) of Ya’ilanum were killed, and all its servants and soldiers were killed, and not one enemy escaped. Rejoice!" Mar-Addu, as the leader of the Ya’ilanum tribe, was decapitated and his head was brought to Yasmah-Addu.

Other family communication 
Although military campaigns and criticism found in letters from both his father and brother depict Yashmah-Adad in a less than capable light, a Mari  letter (c. 1791-1776 B.C.E.) provides us with a glimpse into the family dynamic. This message from Ishme-Dagan I, his brother requests Yashmah-Adad to share the medical expertise with his physician before returning him. "The medication which your physician applied to me in a dressing is extremely good.  The wound has begun to disappear; and slowly, slowly, the medication is about to remove it.  Now, I am sending to you with this letter the physician Samsi-Addu-tukuld; let him have a look at the medicine and then send him back immediately."

See also 
Assyria
Chronology of the ancient Near East
Kings of Assyria

References 

 "Documents Epistolaires du Palais de Mari"
 E.Roux "Ancient Iraq" (Penguin, Harmondsworth)
 Van De Mieroop, Marc. A History of the Ancient Near East ca. 3000-323 B.C. Second Edition Oxford: Wiley-Blackwell, 2007.
 Durand, Jean-Marie. Epistolaires du Palais de Mari. Paris: Les Editions du Cerf, 1997.

Kings of Mari
18th-century BC rulers